Thomas de Grey, 2nd Baron Walsingham PC (14 July 1748 – 16 January 1818), was a British politician who sat in the House of Commons from 1774 to 1781 when he succeeded to the peerage as Baron Walsingham. He served as Joint Postmaster General and was for many years Chairman of Committees in the House of Lords.

Biography
Walsingham was the son of William de Grey, 1st Baron Walsingham, Chief Justice of the Common Pleas, and educated at Eton College from 1760 to 1765 and was admitted at Trinity Hall, Cambridge in 1766. He succeeded his father as 2nd Baron Walsingham on 9 May 1781 and inherited his Merton Hall, Norfolk estate from his uncle Thomas de Grey the same year.

He served as Groom of the Bedchamber to King George III from 1771 to 1777. His other public posts included Lord of Trade (1777–1781), Under-Secretary of State for the American department (February 1778 – September 1780), Vice-Treasurer of Ireland (1784–1787) and joint Postmaster General (1787–1794).

Political career
Walsingham sat as Member of Parliament for Wareham in 1774, for Tamworth from 1774 to 1780, and for Lostwithiel from 1780 to 1781, when he succeeded his father and took his seat in the House of Lords. In 1783 Lord Walsingham was admitted to the Privy Council, and from 1794 to 1814 was Chairman of Committees in the House of Lords.

Family
Lord Walsingham married the Hon. Augusta Georgina Elizabeth Irby, daughter of William Irby, 1st Baron Boston. He died in January 1818, aged 69, and was succeeded in the barony by his eldest son, George.

References

1748 births
1818 deaths
Alumni of Trinity Hall, Cambridge
De Grey, Thomas
De Grey, Thomas
De Grey, Thomas
De Grey, Thomas
Members of the Privy Council of Great Britain
Fellows of the Royal Society
United Kingdom Postmasters General
People from Breckland District
Thomas 2
People educated at Eton College